The Fagales are an order of flowering plants, including some of the best-known trees.  The order name is derived from genus Fagus, beeches.  They belong among the rosid group of dicotyledons. The families and genera currently included are as follows:

Betulaceae – birch family (Alnus, Betula, Carpinus, Corylus, Ostrya, Ostryopsis)
Casuarinaceae – she-oak family (Allocasuarina, Casuarina, Ceuthostoma, Gymnostoma)
Fagaceae – beech family (Castanea, Castanopsis, Chrysolepis, Colombobalanus, Fagus, Lithocarpus, Notholithocarpus, Quercus)
Juglandaceae – walnut family (Alfaroa, Carya, Cyclocarya, Engelhardia, Juglans, Oreomunnea,  Platycarya, Pterocarya, Rhoiptelea)
Myricaceae – bayberry family (Canacomyrica, Comptonia, Myrica)
Nothofagaceae – southern beech family (Nothofagus)
Ticodendraceae – ticodendron family (Ticodendron)

The older Cronquist system only included four families (Betulaceae, Corylaceae, Fagaceae, Ticodendraceae; Corylaceae now being included within Betulaceae); this arrangement is followed by, for example, the World Checklist of selected plant families. The other families were split into three different orders, placed among the Hamamelidae.  The Casuarinales comprised the single family Casuarinaceae, the Juglandales comprised the Juglandaceae and Rhoipteleaceae, and the Myricales comprised the remaining forms (plus Balanops).  The change is due to studies suggesting the Myricales, so defined, are paraphyletic to the other two groups.

Characteristics 
Most Fagales are wind pollinated and are monoecious with unisexual flowers.

Evolutionary history 
The oldest member of the order is the flower Soepadmoa cupulata preserved in the late Turonian-Coniacian New Jersey amber, which is a mosaic with characteristics characteristic of both Nothofagus and other Fagales, suggesting that the ancestor of all Fagales was Nothofagus-like.

Systematics
Modern molecular phylogenetics suggest the following relationships:

References

External links
Missouri Botanical Gardens - Fagales

 
Angiosperm orders